Docufiction (or docu-fiction) is the cinematographic combination of documentary and fiction, this term often meaning narrative film. It is a film genre which attempts to capture reality such as it is (as direct cinema or cinéma vérité) and which simultaneously introduces unreal elements or fictional situations in narrative in order to strengthen the representation of reality using some kind of artistic expression.

More precisely, it is a documentary mixed with fictional elements, in real time, filmed when the events take place, and in which the main character or characters—often portrayed by non-professional or amateur actors—are essentially playing themselves, or slightly fictionalized versions of themselves, in a fictionalized scenario. In this sense, docufiction may overlap to an extent with some aspects of the mockumentary format, but the terms are not synonymous.

A film genre in expansion, it is adopted by a number of experimental filmmakers.

The neologism docufiction appeared at the beginning of the 21st century. It is now commonly used in several languages and widely accepted for classification by international film festivals.

Origins
The term involves a way of making films already practiced by such authors as Robert Flaherty, one of the fathers of documentary, and Jean Rouch, later in the 20th century.

Being both fiction and documentary, docufiction is a hybrid genre, raising ethical problems concerning truth, since reality may be manipulated and confused with fiction (see Ethics at creative non-fiction).

In the domain of visual anthropology, the innovating role of Jean Rouch allows one to consider him as the father of a subgenre called ethnofiction. This term means: ethnographic documentary film with natives who play fictional roles. Making them play a role about themselves will help portray reality, which will be reinforced with imagery. A non-ethnographic documentary with fictional elements uses the same method and, for the same reasons, may be called docufiction.

Docudrama and mockumentary
In contrast, docudrama is usually a dramatized recreation of factual events in form of a documentary, at a time subsequent to the "real" events it portrays. While docudrama can be confused with docufiction, "docudrama" refers specifically to film or other television recreations that dramatize certain events, often with actors. 

A mockumentary is also a film or television show in which fictitious events are presented in documentary format, sometimes a recreation of factual events after they took place or a comment on current events, typically satirical, comedic or even dramatic. Whereas mockumentaries are usually fully scripted comedies or dramas that merely adopt some aspects of documentary format as a framing device, docufictions are usually not scripted, instead placing the participants in a fictionalized scenario while portraying their own genuine reactions and their own improvisational dialogue and character development.

First docufictions by country
 1926: United States – Moana by Robert Flaherty
 1930: Portugal –   Maria do Mar by Leitão de Barros
 1932: France –  L'or des mers by Jean Epstein
 1948: Italy – La Terra Trema by Luchino Visconti
 1952: Japan – Children of Hiroshima by Kaneto Shindo
 1963: Canada – Pour la suite du monde (Of Whales, the Moon and Men) by Pierre Perrault and Michel Brault
 1981: Morocco – Trances by Ahmed El Maânouni
 1988: Guiné-Bissau – Mortu Nega (Death denied) by Flora Gomes
 1990: Iran – Close-up by Abbas Kiarostami
 1991: Finland – Zombie and the Ghost Train by Mika Kaurismäki
 2002:  Brazil – City of God by Fernando Meirelles and Kátia Lund
 2005: Iraq –  Underexposure by Oday Rasheed

Other notable examples 
 1927: Chang: A Drama of the Wilderness by Merian C. Cooper and Ernest B. Schoedsack (US)
 1931: Tabu by Robert Flaherty and F.W. Murnau (US)
 1934: Man of Aran by Robert Flaherty (US)
 1942: Ala-Arriba! by Leitão de Barros (Portugal)
 1948: Louisiana Story by Robert Flaherty (US)
 1956: On the Bowery by Lionel Rogosin (US)
 1958: Walt Disney's White Wilderness by James Algar (US)
 1958: Moi, un noir (Me, A Black Man) by Jean Rouch (France)
 1959 India Matri Bhumi (The Motherland)India: Matri Bhumi  – Article by Doug Cummings at Filmjourney  (March 18th, 2007) by Roberto Rossellini, released 2007 (Italy)
 1959: Come Back, Africa by Lionel Rogosin (US)
 1961: La pyramide humaine by Jean Rouch  (The Human Pyramid) (France)
 1962: Rite of Spring by Manoel de Oliveira (Portugal)
 1964: Belarmino by Fernando Lopes (Portugal)
 1967: David Holzman's Diary by Jim McBride (US)
 1970: The Clowns by Federico Fellini (Italy)Revue by Jamie Havlin at Louder than War
 1973: Trevico-Torino (viaggio nel Fiat-Nam) by Ettore Scola (Italy)
 1974: Orders (Les Ordres), by Michel Brault (Canada)
 1974: Montreal Main, by Frank Vitale (Canada)
 1976: People from Praia da Vieira by António Campos (Portugal)
 1976: Trás-os-Montes (Portugal)[http://www.cinema.ucla.edu/events/2012-07-06/films-and-legacy-antonio-reis-and-margarida-cordeiro António Reis and Margarida Cordeiro at UCLA
 1982: Ana by António Reis and Margarida Cordeiro (Portugal)
 1982: After the Axe, by Sturla Gunnarsson (Canada)After the Axe – reference note with film online by Sturla Gunnarsson, National Film Board of Canada
 1984: The Masculine Mystique by Giles Walker and John N. Smith (Canada) 
 1985: 90 Days by Giles Walker (Canada)
 1986: Sitting in Limbo by John N. Smith (Canada)
 1987: The Last Straw by Giles Walker (Canada)
 1987: Train of Dreams by John N. Smith (Canada)Train of Dreams at the [IMDb]
 1989: Welcome to Canada by John N. Smith (Canada)
 1990: The Company of Strangers by Cynthia Scott (Canada)
 1991: And Life Goes On by Abbas Kiarostami (Iran)
 2000: In Vanda's Room by Pedro Costa (Portugal)In Vanda's Room – review by Richard Brody at The New Yorker
 2002: Ten by Abbas Kiarostami (Iran)Ten – review by Peter Bradshaw, The Guardian, 27 Sep 2002
 2006: Colossal Youth by Pedro Costa (Portugal)Colossal Youth is a colossal confusion – review by  Samuel Wigley, April 29, 2008
 2008: Our Beloved Month of August by Miguel Gomes (Portugal)film/review/our-beloved-month-of-august Our Beloved Month of August – review by Glenn Heath Jr. at Slant Magazine, September 7, 2010
 2009: Carcasses by Denis Côté (Canada)
 2009: The Mouth of the Wolf by Pietro Marcello (Italy)The Wolf's Mouth – review by Neil Young at The Hollywood Reporter, October 14, 2010
 2013: Closed Curtain by Jafar Panahi and Kambuzia Partovi (Iran)‘Closed Curtain’ Directed8 by Jafar Panahi And Kambuzia Partovi – review by Christopher Bell at IndieWire, July 10, 2014
 2015: Taxi by Jafar Panahi (Iran)Jafar Panahi’s Remarkable “Taxi” – review by Richard Brody, New Yorker, October 13, 2015
 2016: Tuktuq by Robin Aubert (Canada)
 2018: Mad Dog Labine by Jonathan Beaulieu-Cyr and Renaud Lessard (Canada)
 2019: Rolling Thunder Revue'' by Martin Scorsese (US)

See also

 Cinéma vérité
 Docudrama – a dramatized documentary
 Ethnofiction
 Mockumentary – a parodical or humoristic fictional documentary
 Pseudo-documentary – a fake documentary, often presented as real
 Scripted reality – a subgenre of reality television, in which parts of the contents are fictional and scripted
 Visual anthropology

References

Sources and bibliography
THESES online
  Docufiction in the Digital Age – thesis by Tay Huizhen, National University of Singapore
  The Zulu Mask: The Role of Creative Imagination in Documentary Film – thesis by Clifford Derrick, Faculty of Arts, University of the Witwatersrand, Johannesburg
  Docudrama: the real (his)tory thesis by Çiçek Coşkun (New York University School of Education)
  Issues in contemporary documentary by Jane Chapman at Google Books (pages 1 to 34)

ARTICLES and ESSAYS
  Shaping the Real: Directorial imagination and the visualisation of evidence in the hybrid documentary – article by Janet Merewether at Scan, Media Department at Macquarie University, Sydney
  Docufiction: Where Art and Life Merge and Diverge– Article by Julie Drizin at Makers Quest 2.0
  New Media Documentary  – Paper by Gunthar Hartwig
  Docudrama: the real (his)tory
  Panel: At The Edge of Truth: Hybrid Documentaries at Vox Talk magazine
  The dual phase oscillation hypothesis and the neuropsychology of docu-fiction film – article by Dyutiman Mukhopadhyay, Consciousness, Literature and the Arts, vol. 16, no. 1, April 2015
  A creative treatment of actuality – paper by Peter Biesterfeld at Videomaker, August 7, 2015
  The art paradox – article by Bert Oliver at Thought Leader, September 17, 2012

  Le documentaire historique au péril du « docufiction – thesis by François Garçon (abstract in English and French)
  3 questions à…Isabelle Veyrat-Masson – interview (Le Journal du CNRS)
  Peter Watkins, un cinéaste maudit article at Critikat

  Un genere cinematografico: la docu-fiction. Il caso di 150 ore a Pavia by Laura Marchesi (thesis – abstract)

CITATIONS
  
  
  

Neologisms
Film genres
Cinematic techniques
Drama genres
Documentary film genres
 
Fiction by genre
Fiction forms
Television genres